Ya-Jun Pan is a Chinese and Canadian mechanical engineer whose research involves robust and nonlinear control for teleoperation and multi-agent systems. She is a professor of mechanical engineering at Dalhousie University, where she directs the Advanced Control and Mechatronics Laboratory.

Education and career
Pan studied mechanical engineering at Yanshan University, graduating in 1996. After earning a master's degree in mechanical engineering at Zhejiang University in 1999, she completed a Ph.D. in electrical and computer engineering at the National University of Singapore in 2003.

Before becoming a faculty member at Dalhousie, she was a postdoctoral researcher in France with CNRS at the Laboratoire d'automatique de Grenoble, and in Canada at the University of Alberta.

Recognition
Pan was named as an ASME Fellow in 2017. In 2021 she was elected as a Fellow of the Engineering Institute of Canada, as "an internationally renowned expert in robust nonlinear control and networked control systems with successful in-depth applications to tele-robotics, cooperative systems, unmanned systems, industrial automation, and rehabilitations".

References

External links
Home page

Year of birth missing (living people)
Living people
Canadian mechanical engineers
Canadian women engineers
Chinese mechanical engineers
Chinese women engineers
Control theorists
Yanshan University alumni
Zhejiang University alumni
National University of Singapore alumni
Academic staff of the Dalhousie University
Fellows of the American Society of Mechanical Engineers